Wisdom of War is an original novel based on the U.S. television series Buffy the Vampire Slayer.

Plot summary

Two strange breeds of sea creatures are beginning to appear in Sunnydale, and none of them appear to be all too friendly. The Moruach and the Aegeirie are their names, the latter being followers of the immense sea beast Aegir who was once captured by the Moruach but later set free. As soon as Buffy is beginning to discover these creatures, the Watcher's Council steps in with a team with Quentin Travers leading the way. When Buffy does not agree to slay all the demons until she knows more about them and what they're doing in Sunnydale, Travers has Faith released from jail in Los Angeles for a temporary time in order to eradicate the demons in Sunnydale. Buffy begins to question her decision as well as her actions when innocent humans, including some of her friends, begin to transform into Aegir followers.

Continuity

Takes place in the second half of Buffy season 5, but before "I Was Made to Love You".
Breaks with established Buffyverse canon by involving a Faith jailbreak long before "Salvage".

Canonical issues

Buffy books such as this one are not usually considered by fans as canonical. Some fans consider them stories from the imaginations of authors and artists, while other fans consider them as taking place in an alternative fictional reality. However unlike fan fiction, overviews summarising their story, written early in the writing process, were 'approved' by both Fox and Joss Whedon (or his office), and the books were therefore later published as officially Buffy/Angel merchandise.

External links

Reviews
Litefoot1969.bravepages.com - Review of this book by Litefoot
Teen-books.com - Reviews of this book
Nika-summers.com - Review of this book by Nika Summers
Shadowcat.name - Review of this book

2002 American novels
Books based on Buffy the Vampire Slayer
2002 fantasy novels